Drilaster is a genus of beetles belonging to the family Lampyridae.

The species of this genus are found in Japan.

Species

Species:

Drilaster agcoensis 
Drilaster akakanajai 
Drilaster akusekianus

References

Lampyridae
Lampyridae genera